Eupithecia tantilloides is a moth in the family Geometridae first described by Hiroshi Inoue in 1958. It is found on the Kuriles and in Japan.

The wingspan is about 16–17 mm.

References

Moths described in 1958
tantilloides
Moths of Asia